Worthy.com is an online liquidation marketplace for pre-owned luxury goods including diamonds, brand-named watches, and diamond jewelry. Worthy is headquartered in New York City and was founded by investment banker Ben De-Kalo in 2014.

What Worthy Does 
Worthy is an online platform that provides buyers and sellers with a safe and luxurious auction marketplace. Sellers send their jewelry from all over the US to Worthy headquarters for appraisals, GIA grading, market value estimations and ultimately the sale of their item.

Worthy's company works to build brand trust and loyalty by assuming all of the risks, covering the FedEx shipping, insurance with Lloyd's of London, complimentary grading at the best labs in the world, professional photography and putting valuables up for auction with the ability to set a reserve. Through this process, they place high importance on upholding core values of transparency, integrity, privacy, and convenience.

Anyone within the United States is able to sell with Worthy. Sellers must register online and describe their valuable items. Worthy accepts a variety of precious metals including gold and silver, Rolex watches, and other valuable jewelry containing diamonds and colored stones such as emerald and rubies.

Buyers are carefully vetted through Worthy. The Worthy buyer platform is specifically built for industry insiders and knowledgeable collectors. Worthy was designed to give sellers an advantage in the resale market so their online buyer community is composed of industry professionals. The buyers are certified with a reputable background and experience in the field.

How Worthy Works 

First, the seller describes a valuable and schedules a shipment to Worth via FedEx, insured for up to $100,000 by Lloyd's of London. When the item arrives at Worthy offices, it is screened and put into a tracking system.  Worthy gets the valuable ready for auction by carefully cleaning it and having beauty shots taken by professional photographers.  Then a diamond lab such as GIA, GSI, or IGI grades it. Watches are inspected by Central Watch in NYC.  Then an auction listing is created, including the lab grading and beauty shot.  The sellers sets a reserve price, optionally using Worthy's recommended price guarantee.

As offers from vetted professionals come in, sellers decide what offer to accept. Once the auction has concluded, sellers will receive the final sale amount minus Worthy commission.

History 
Worthy.com was launched in May 2014. The company got its start when De-Kalo and his wife wished to sell a diamond necklace in order to put the money from its sale toward a new one. The De-Kalos found that their resale options were limited. De-Kalo saw an opportunity to create an online auction platform in which sellers send their items to the company's headquarters in New York for evaluation, after which goods would be auctioned online to a network of pre-selected professional buyers.

The marketplace itself is solely online, with the availability of walk-ins for the item submission stage. Goods offered for resale are also physically evaluated and stored offline during the auction process. It is distinguished from other online auction marketplaces by its evaluation process and guarantees offered to both buying and selling parties.

Online auction platform 

In an interview published in Forbes in November 2016, Ben De-Kalo describes Worthy.com as a “consumer-to-business” auction liquidation website. Worthy.com offers an online auction platform for selling pre-owned diamond jewelry, loose diamonds, and luxury watches. The company first identifies the market value of the item through an automatic pricing engine and then agrees on a reserve price with the sellers. The diamonds sold at Worthy.com are graded at the Gemological Institute of America (GIA) or at the International Gemology Institute (IGI). The brand-named watches are authenticated at CentralWatch. Prior to auction, Worthy.com makes available the item's photographs and diamond grading report to the networks of pre-selected professional buyers. The online auction can be watched live by the seller, and both sellers and buyers receive real time updates on the auction status. Once the auction finishes, if the final offer is above the reserve price, the deal is closed. And if the final offer is below the reserve price, the seller can decide to sell it for that price or have the item shipped back. According to Worthy.com CEO, Ben De-Kalo, about 85% of the auctions at Worthy.com are closed successfully.

References

External links 
 Official Website
Worthy Blog 
Sell Jewelry Online 
Sell your Diamond ring for the best price 
Sell Luxury watches 
Divorce & Other Things You Can Handle- Podcast 
Healing after Divorce- blog 
Building your career after divorce- blog 
Positive Aging- blog  
Handling an inheritance-Blog

Companies based in New York (state)
Internet properties established in 2014
2014 establishments in New York City